Guillaume Couillard and Jean-René Lisnard were the defending champion but Lisnard decided not to participate.
Couillard plays alongside Thomas Oger, and they defeated Stefano Galvani and Domenico Vicini 6–3, 6–3 in the final.

Seeds

 Guillaume Couillard / Thomas Oger (champions)
 Stefano Galvani / Domenico Vicini (final)

Draw

References
 Main Draw

Tennis at the 2011 Games of the Small States of Europe